Meziměstí is a town in Náchod District in the Hradec Králové Region of the Czech Republic. It has about 2,300 inhabitants.

Administrative parts
Villages of Březová, Pomeznice, Ruprechtice, Starostín and Vižňov are administrative parts of Meziměstí. Březová forms an exclave of the municipal territory.

Geography
It borders Poland in the west and north. It lies in the Broumov Highlands, in the Broumovsko Protected Landscape Area. The highest point 
The Stěnava River flows through the town.

History
The first written mention of Meziměstí is from 1408, under the name Dolní Vižňov. From 1434, it was called by its German name Halbstadt. In 1499, it became a property of Benedictine Broumov Monastery. The abbots of the monastery set up a summer residence here.

In the late 19th century, Meziměstí was industrialized. In 1918, it received its Czech name.

During the German occupation of Czechoslovakia in 1944–1945, the Germans operated a subcamp of the Gross-Rosen concentration camp, whose prisoners were Jewish women from Poland and Hungary, transported from the Auschwitz concentration camp.

After the World War II, the German population was expelled and replaced by Czech settlers. During the 1960s and 1970s, intensive housing construction took place here. In 1992, Meziměstí received the town status.

Transport
There are six border crossings with Poland in the territory. In addition to four pedestrian crossings, there is the road crossing Starostín / Golińsk and the railway crossing Meziměstí / Mieroszów.

Sights

A valuable Baroque building is the Meziměstí Castle. It was built according to the plans of the architect Kilian Ignaz Dientzenhofer in 1750. Today the building is privately owned.

The Church of Saint Anne in Vižňov was built in 1724–1728. The Church of Saint James the Great in Ruprechtice dates from 1723 and was probably also designed by K. I. Dientzenhofer.

References

External links

Cities and towns in the Czech Republic
Czech Republic–Poland border crossings